Gabedit is a graphical user interface to GAMESS (US), Gaussian, MOLCAS, MOLPRO, MPQC, OpenMopac, PC GAMESS, ORCA and Q-Chem computational chemistry packages.

Major features 
 Builds molecules by atom, ring, group, amino acid and nucleoside.
 Creates an input file for computational chemistry packages.
 Reads output from the ab initio packages, and supports a number of other formats.
 Displays molecular orbitals or electron density as contour plots or 3D grid plots and output to a number of graphical formats.
 Animates molecular vibrations, contours, isosurfaces and rotation.

See also 

 List of molecular graphics systems
 PC GAMESS
  ORCA
 Quantum chemistry computer programs
 SAMSON

External links
 Gabedit official website

Computational chemistry software
Science software that uses GTK
Free chemistry software
Chemistry software for Linux